is a Japanese historical drama and romance manga written and illustrated by Chie Shinohara. It is serialized on Shogakukan's 姉系PetitComic manga magazine since May 2010, with its chapters collected into fourteen tankōbon volumes as of April 2020.

Characters

Main Characters

 The female protagonist of the story, Alexandra is kidnapped by pillagers raiding her village in Ruthenia and taken to Constantinople to be sold as a slave. One night, Alexandra runs away from the slavers, but is lost in the streets of Constantinople and almost assaulted. She is rescued by a mysterious black-haired man named Mateus who tells her to gain knowledge in order to gain true freedom and escorts her back to the slavers. At a slave auction, she is purchased by Mateus who educates and trains her in upper class etiquette, and skills such as singing, dancing, music, and the Ottoman Turkish language. Alexandra falls in love with Mateus, and so, she meticulously studies to become his ideal woman, hoping that Mateus will accept her into his harem. Upon completion of her training, Mateus gives her the Turkish name, Hurrem, and gifts her to his master and sultan, Suleiman, who accepts her into his harem. Hurrem quickly rises in ranks in the harem and eventually becomes an iqbal - a favorite concubine - of Suleiman, and later bears him three children.

Reception
It was number twenty on the 2012 Kono Manga ga Sugoi! Top 20 Manga for Female Readers survey.

Volume 1 reached the 16th place on the weekly Oricon manga charts, and, as of September 18, 2011, has sold 66,987 copies. Volume 4 reached the 3rd place, and, as of September 22, 2013, has sold 150,325 copies. Volume 5 reached the 10th place and, as of August 17, 2014, has sold 124,952 copies. Volume 6 reached the 3rd place and, as of February 15, 2015, has sold 110,095 copies.

References

External links
 

2011 manga
Chie Shinohara
Shogakukan manga
Josei manga
Historical anime and manga
Romance anime and manga
Drama anime and manga